2020 Rajya Sabha elections were the set of indirect elections by the members of State legislatures of India, to elect new members to fill vacancies in the Rajya Sabha – the upper house of the Parliament of India. The elections are held annually and throughout the year on an ad hoc basis. The elections in 2020 are for a total of 73 seats of which 55 of them were to be elected by March 26. The remaining were postponed due to the COVID-19 pandemic. The Election Commission of India later announced all the elections for the remaining 24 Rajya Sabha seats were to be held on 19 June 2020.

On 12 June 2020, Election commission of India declared unopposed victory over 4 seats of Karnataka and 1 seat of Arunachal Pradesh. Leaving behind 19 seats to go for elections on 19 June 2020.

On 2 November 2020, Election commission of India declared unopposed victory over 10 seats of Uttar Pradesh and 1 seat of Uttarakhand.

Results

April Election

Maharashtra

Odisha

Tamil Nadu

West Bengal

Andhra Pradesh

Assam

Bihar

Chhattisgarh

Gujarat

Haryana

Himachal Pradesh

Jharkhand

Madhya Pradesh

Manipur

Rajasthan

Telangana

Meghalaya

June Election

Arunachal Pradesh

Karnataka

Mizoram

November Election

Uttar Pradesh

Uttarakhand

By-elections
Aside from automatic elections, unforeseen vacancies caused by members' resignation, death or disqualification, are unless a few months before the expected natural expiry of the term of tenure, filled via by-elections, which for the Rajya Sabha often take some months to organise.

Haryana

 On 20 January 2020 Birender Singh Resigned from membership of the Rajya Sabha from Haryana

Bihar

On 8 October 2020, Union Minister Ram Vilas Paswan died.

Uttar Pradesh 

 On 27 March 2020 Beni Prasad Verma died.
 On 1 August 2020 Amar Singh died.

Kerala 

 On 28 May 2020 Veerendra Kumar died.

Karnataka 

 On 17 September 2020 Ashok Gasti died.

Nominations
Note:
 Listed According Date Of Retirement

Nominated

Notes

References

2020
Rajya